Ludong University is a provincial public university in Yantai, Shandong, China. Founded in 1958, the institution was first known as Yantai Teachers Speciality School and since 1984 as Yantai Normal University. The institution was granted the university status in 2006. Ludong University offers 48 majors in arts and sciences.

External links
 Ludong University website 

Universities and colleges in Shandong